Hoshyar Singh (born 02 October 1966) is an Indian politician, who currently serves as Member of Legislative Assembly from Dehra Assembly constituency. Hoshyar Singh won from Dehra constituency in 2017 state assembly elections as an independent candidate. He joined BJP in June, 2022.

Early life and education
Singh was born on 02 October 1966 in Malad East, Bombay, Maharashtra to Amar Singh and Vidya Devi. He did his graduation from Patkar-Varde College.

Politics
Singh's active state politics started from 2017. He was elected to the thirteenth Himachal Pradesh Legislative Assembly in December, 2017 as an independent candidate from Dehra constituency. He joined Bharatiya Janata Party in June, 2022, while staying in the office as an Independent MLA from Dehra constituency.

References
 

Bharatiya Janata Party politicians from Himachal Pradesh
1966 births
Living people
Himachal Pradesh MLAs 2017–2022